The designation All American often refers to the hyphenated term All-American, a noun or adjective denoting players selected for an All-America sports team. Of an individual, all-American may mean that the person (often male) expresses the qualities often associated with the United States and its culture and ideals.

All American or The All American may also refer to:

Games, sports 

 All American Football League, a proposed American football league
 All American Futurity, a horse race held in New Mexico
 All American Racers, an American racing team founded in 1964
 All American (video poker), a video poker game
 College Football All-America Team, an honor given annually to the best American college football players
 NCAA Men's Basketball All-Americans
 NCAA Women's Basketball All-Americans
 McDonald's All-American Game, an annual all-star basketball game
 U.S. Army All-American Bowl, a high school football game played annually in San Antonio, Texas

Aircraft 

 All American (aircraft), a World War II B-17 bomber aircraft
 All American Aircraft, an aircraft manufacturer formed in 1945

Film, TV 

 All American (film), a 1953 film starring Tony Curtis
 All American (TV series), a 2018 American television series that airs on The CW
 The All American (film), a 1932 American sports drama starring Richard Arlen

Music 

 All American (Hoodie Allen album), a 2012 album
 All American (musical), a 1962 Broadway show
 All American (Nick Carter album), a 2015 album
 "All American", a song by Todrick Hall from Forbidden

Other 

 All-American Canal, a canal in southeastern California
 All-American Division, 82nd Airborne Division of the US Army 
 All-American Publications, a comic book company founded in 1938
 All-American Road, the designation of the most scenic National Scenic Byways
 Blue Bird All American, an American school bus that began production in 1948